The 2000–01 Vysshaya Liga season was the ninth season of the Vysshaya Liga, the second level of ice hockey in Russia. 25 teams participated in the league, and HC Spartak Moscow and Krylya Sovetov Moscow earned the opportunity to be promoted to the Russian Superleague.

First round

Western Conference

Eastern Conference

Final round

External links 
 Season on hockeyarchives.info
 Season on hockeyarchives.ru

Russian Major League seasons
2000–01 in Russian ice hockey leagues
Rus